The Siemens S65 is a mobile phone by Siemens. It is bundled with a replaceable 32 MB MMC card. It also features a 1.3-megapixel digital camera. It was targeted to premium users.

A version for the corporate market, the Siemens SP65, was released without a camera due to camera phones often being prohibited.

Cell phone reusage 
Electronics hobbyists often rescue LCD from cell phones
 Siemens CX65, M65, S65 and SK65 have 132x176 pixel resolution with 16 bit definition based on 3 different chips:
 If module is called LPH88xxxx the controller is an Hitachi HD66773
 Module LS020xxx owns a Sharp device
 L2F50 is controlled with an Epson L2F50 chip
 C65 phones have a 130x130 pixel resolution with 16 bit LCD controlled by a Philips PCF8833

 Official support 256MB Multimedia Card unofficial to up 1GB only. Only SanDisk 7-pin card
y SanDisk with certificated Multimedia Card Associated

External links 
 vrtp.ru
 superkranz.de
 elektroda.pl
 mikrocontroller.net
 forum.sevstar.net
 gsm-club.pl

S65
Mobile phones introduced in 2004
Mobile phones with infrared transmitter